Taylor Gang Entertainment is an American entertainment company. Co-founded by rapper Wiz Khalifa in 2008, it operates as an independent record label, music management, music production and film company based in Pittsburgh, Pennsylvania. The record label is home to artists such as Wiz Khalifa, Berner, and Juicy J who serves as A&R for the label. TM88 is a producer for the label. The company is currently headquartered at ID Labs in Pittsburgh.

History

The Taylor Gang was originally coined in 2006 to refer to "Taylors" who are supporters of Wiz Khalifa. Taylor Gang Ent. was co-founded in 2008 by Khalifa. The record label was named after Khalifa's alma mater, Taylor Allderdice High School, and his affinity for Converse Chuck Taylor All-Star sneakers. Taylor Gang Ent. began as Khalifa's fan base network, street team and home to his crew. The entity later became a full entertainment company encompassing record label, management services, production and film companies. Chevy Woods, Berner, and Tuki Carter all signed to the record label in 2011. In December 2012, Juicy J joined the entertainment company. In 2013, Ty Dolla $ign joined the company as well. In 2014, J.R. Donato signed to the label. That year, Taylor Gang Records selected INgrooves to manage their global distribution and marketing.

The record label also doubles as a super group and announced plans to release an album as a group in 2016.

Taylor Gang Ent. partnered with brands to create licensing deals, most notably, Grenco Science in 2014 for a series of vaporizer products and Neff to produce a special 26-piece apparel collection composed of T-shirts, jerseys and hats. The creative collaboration among the label's artists and Neff.

Roster

Current artists

 Berner
 Chevy Woods
 DJ Bonics
 E. Dan (producer)
Fedd The God
 Juicy J 
 Kris Hollis
 Sk8
 Sledgren (Producer)
 Sosamann
 TM88 (Producer)
Tuki Carter
Ty Dolla $ign
 Wiz Khalifa
 Young Deji

Former artists

Lola Monroe
Jimmy Wopo (Deceased)
Courtney Noelle

TGOD Mafia

TGOD (Taylor Gang or Die) Mafia is an American supergroup composed of Taylor Gang Entertainment signees. Their debut project, TGOD Mafia: Rude Awakening (2016), peaked at number 26 on the Billboard 200 and was produced entirely by in-house producer TM88.

Discography

Studio albums

Wiz Khalifa

Ty Dolla $ign

Juicy J

Project Pat

Taylor Gang

Tuki Carter

Berner

Chevy Woods

EPs

Mixtapes

Wiz Khalifa

Chevy Woods

Project Pat

Ty Dolla $ign

Tuki Carter

J.R. Donato

References

External links
 

American independent record labels
Companies based in Pittsburgh
Film production companies of the United States
Music production companies
Record labels established in 2009
Hip hop record labels
Vanity record labels